Patrick Howald (born December 26, 1969) is a Swiss former professional ice hockey winger.

Career
Howald played in the Nationalliga A for SC Bern, HC Lugano and HC Fribourg-Gottéron. He won four NLA Championships with SC Bern and the number 22 jersey is retired by the team in his honour. He was drafted 276th overall by the Los Angeles Kings in the 1987 NHL Entry Draft but remained in Switzerland throughout his career and never played in North America. Howald was also a member of the Switzerland national ice hockey team and played in the 1992 Winter Olympics in Albertville, France.

Career statistics

Achievements
1989 - NLA Champion with SC Bern
1991 - NLA Champion with SC Bern
1992 - NLA Champion with SC Bern
1997 - NLA Champion with SC Bern

His jersey number #22 was retired by his club on Dec 1, 2009.

International play
Patrick Howald played a total of 119 games for the Swiss national team.

He participated in the following tournaments:

 4 A-World Championships: 1991, 1992, 1993, 1995
 2 B-World Championships: 1990, 1994
 1 Olympic Games: 1992 in Albertville

External links

1969 births
Living people
HC Fribourg-Gottéron players
HC Lugano players
Ice hockey players at the 1992 Winter Olympics
Los Angeles Kings draft picks
Olympic ice hockey players of Switzerland
SC Bern players
Ice hockey people from Bern
Swiss ice hockey left wingers